Ginery Twichell (August 26, 1811 – July 23, 1883) was president of the Boston and Worcester Railroad in the 1860s, the Republican Representative for Massachusetts for three consecutive terms and the sixth president of the Atchison, Topeka and Santa Fe Railway.

He was born in Athol, Massachusetts.  Some references list his actual birth date as August 22, 1811 (Waters, p. 43), while others list it as August 26, 1811 (Congress Bioguide; and Massachusetts Vital Records).  In 1827 Twichell left school to seek employment in a local mill.  Subsequent jobs saw him working with livestock and later in retail.  His strengths in transportation began to show in 1830 when he took control of a stage line between Barre and Worcester.

As a manager and business owner, Twichell gained a reputation for kindness and generosity, even toward his business competition.  He saw his stage line grow to include many more lines throughout New England.  When the Boston and Worcester Railroad (B&W) opened on July 1, 1835, Twichell's stage lines were both competition and complement to the railroad's service.  This quasi-partnership lasted until June 1, 1848, when Twichell became the assistant superintendent of the railroad.  Twichell rose through the B&W's ranks, becoming president in 1857.

In 1867 Twichell was elected to Congress where he served as a Republican Representative for Massachusetts.  He was twice reelected, in 1869 and again in 1871, to stretch his tenure to three consecutive terms.

During his third term as a Representative, Twichell became president of the growing Atchison, Topeka and Santa Fe Railway in 1870.  During his term with the Santa Fe, the railroad built the rest of the mainline across Kansas from Topeka, connecting to Dodge City, Kansas, on September 5, 1872, and then the Colorado state line by the end of 1873.  Twichell served the Santa Fe Railroad for three years, leaving in 1873 to return to Massachusetts where he led the Boston, Barre and Gardner Railroad and the Hoosac Tunnel and Wilmington Railroad.

Twichell died on July 23, 1883, in Brookline, Massachusetts, of typhoid fever.

See also
Ginery Twichell House, a property he owned (but did not live in) in Brookline

References

 Biographical Directory of the United States Congress, Ginery Twichell. Retrieved July 15, 2005. (lists birth date as August 26, 1811).
Denehy, John William.  history of Brookline, Massachusetts, from the first settlement of Muddy River Until the Present Time 1630-1906, page 136 (1906). (lists birth date as August 26
Twitchel, Ralph E.: Stage Driver to Railroad President, Ginery Twitchell, Progressive in Transportation Matters becomes one or the First Presidents of the Santa Fe. The Santa Fe Magazine, January 1923, Vol XVII, Number 2.  (lists birth date as August 25, 1811).
 p 43–44. (lists birth date as August 22, 1811).

1811 births
1883 deaths
Politicians from Brookline, Massachusetts
Atchison, Topeka and Santa Fe Railway presidents
People from Athol, Massachusetts
Deaths from typhoid fever
Republican Party members of the United States House of Representatives from Massachusetts
19th-century American politicians
19th-century American businesspeople